Baker City Forest Reserve was established by the General Land Office in Oregon on February 5, 1904 with .  In 1905 all federal forests were transferred to the U.S. Forest Service. On March 15, 1906 portions of Baker City were combined with Blue Mountains Forest Reserve.  The remainder was taken out of the Forest Service system and the name was discontinued. The lands are presently distributed among several Oregon forests.

References

External links
Forest History Society
Listing of the National Forests of the United States and Their Dates (from the Forest History Society website) Text from Davis, Richard C., ed. Encyclopedia of American Forest and Conservation History. New York: Macmillan Publishing Company for the Forest History Society, 1983. Vol. II, pp. 743-788.

Former National Forests of Oregon
1904 establishments in Oregon
Protected areas established in 1904
1906 disestablishments in Oregon